

Events

January

 
 January 3 – José Ramón Guizado becomes president of Panama.
 January 17 – , the first nuclear-powered submarine, puts to sea for the first time, from Groton, Connecticut.
 January 18–20 – Battle of Yijiangshan Islands: The Chinese Communist People's Liberation Army seizes the islands from the Republic of China (Taiwan).
 January 22 – In the United States, The Pentagon announces a plan to develop intercontinental ballistic missiles (ICBMs), armed with nuclear weapons.
 January 23 – The Sutton Coldfield rail crash kills 17, near Birmingham, England.
 January 25 – The Presidium of the Supreme Soviet of the Soviet Union announces the end of the war between the USSR and Germany, which began during World War II in 1941.
 January 28 – The United States Congress authorizes President Dwight D. Eisenhower to use force to protect Taiwan from the People's Republic of China.

February

 February 10 – The United States Seventh Fleet helps the Republic of China evacuate the Chinese Nationalist army and residents from the Tachen Islands to Taiwan.
 February 16 – Nearly 100 die in a fire at a home for the elderly in Yokohama, Japan.
 February 19 – The Southeast Asia Treaty Organization (SEATO) is established, at a meeting in Bangkok.
 February 22 – In Chicago's Democratic primary, Mayor Martin H. Kennelly loses to the head of the Cook County Democratic Party, Richard J. Daley, 364,839 to 264,077.
 February 24 – The Baghdad Pact (CENTO), originally known as Middle East Treaty Organization (METO), is signed between Iraq and Turkey.

March

 March 2 – Claudette Colvin, a 15-year-old African-American girl, refuses to give up her seat on a bus in Montgomery, Alabama, to a white woman after the driver demands it. She is carried off the bus backwards, while being kicked, handcuffed and harassed on the way to the police station. She becomes a plaintiff in Browder v. Gayle (1956), which rules bus segregation to be unconstitutional.
 March 5
 WBBJ-TV signs on the air in Jackson, Tennessee, with WDXI as its initial call-letters, to expand American commercial television in mostly rural areas.
 Elvis Presley makes his television debut on "Louisiana Hayride", carried by KSLA-TV Shreveport in the United States.
 March 7 – The Broadway musical version of Peter Pan, which had opened in 1954 starring Mary Martin, is presented on television for the first time by NBC-TV, with its original cast, as an installment of Producers' Showcase. It is also the first time that a stage musical is presented in its entirety on TV, almost exactly as it was performed on stage. This program gains the largest viewership of a TV special up to this time, and it becomes one of the first great TV family musical classics.
 March 17 – Richard Riot in Montreal: 6,000 people protest the suspension of French Canadian ice hockey star Maurice Richard of the Montreal Canadiens by the National Hockey League, following a violent incident during a match.
 March 19 – KXTV signs on the air in Sacramento, California, as the 100th commercial television station in the United States.
 March 20 – The movie adaptation of Evan Hunter's novel Blackboard Jungle premieres in the United States, featuring the famous single "Rock Around the Clock" by Bill Haley & His Comets. Teenagers jump from their seats to dance to the song.

April

 April 1 – EOKA starts a resistance campaign against British rule in the Crown colony of Cyprus.
 April 5
 Winston Churchill resigns as Prime Minister of the United Kingdom, due to ill-health, at the age of 80.
 Richard J. Daley defeats Robert Merrian to become Mayor of Chicago, by a vote of 708,222 to 581,555.
 April 6 – Anthony Eden becomes Prime Minister of the United Kingdom.
 April 10 – In the American National Basketball Association championship, the Syracuse Nationals defeat the Fort Wayne Pistons 92–91 in Game 7, to win the title.
 April 11
 The Taiwanese Kuomintang put a bomb on the airplane Kashmir Princess, killing 16 but failing to assassinate the People's Republic of China leader, Zhou Enlai.
 Taekwondo, a form of Korean martial arts, is officially recognized  in South Korea.
 April 12 – The Salk polio vaccine, having passed large-scale trials earlier in the United States, receives full approval by the Food and Drug Administration.
 April 14 – The Detroit Red Wings win the Stanley Cup in North American ice hockey for the 7th time in franchise history, but will not win again until 1997.
 April 14 – A 7.1 earthquake shakes the Chinese city of Kangding leaving 70 dead.
 April 15 – The first franchised McDonald's restaurant is opened by Ray Kroc, in Des Plaines, Illinois.
 April 16 – The Burma-Japan Peace Treaty, signed in Rangoon on November 5, 1954, comes into effect, formally ending a state of war between the two countries.
 April 17 – Imre Nagy, the communist Premier of Hungary, is ousted for being too moderate.
 April 18–24 – The Asian-African Conference is held in Bandung, Indonesia.

May

 May 5 – West Germany becomes a sovereign country, recognized by Western countries such as France, the United Kingdom, Canada and the United States.
 May 6 – The Western European Union Charter becomes effective.
 May 7 – Newcastle United F.C. beat Manchester City F.C. 3–1 to win the 1955 FA Cup final.
 May 9
 West Germany joins the North Atlantic Treaty Organization (NATO).
 A young Jim Henson introduces the earliest version of Kermit the Frog (made in March), in the premiere of his puppet show Sam and Friends, on WRC-TV in Washington, D.C.
 May 11 – Japanese National Railways' ferry Shiun Maru sinks after a collision with sister ship Uko Maru, in thick fog off Takamatsu, Shikoku, in the Seto Inland Sea of Japan; 166 passengers (many children) and 2 crew members are killed. This event is influential in plans to construct the Akashi Kaikyō Bridge (built 1986–98).
 May 12 – New York's Third Avenue Elevated runs its last train between Chatham Square in Manhattan and East 149th Street in the Bronx, thus ending elevated train service in Manhattan.
 May 14
 Eight Communist Bloc countries, including the Soviet Union, sign a mutual defence treaty in Warsaw, Poland, that is called the Warsaw Pact (it will be dissolved in 1991).
 Warrington win the British Rugby League Championship title for the third time; they will not win it again within the following 60 years.
 May 15
 The Austrian State Treaty, which restores Austria's national sovereignty, is concluded between the 4 occupying powers following World War II (the United Kingdom, the United States, the Soviet Union, and France) and Austria, setting it up as a neutral country.
 Lionel Terray and Jean Couzy become the first people to reach the summit of Makalu, the fifth-highest mountain in the world, on the 1955 French Makalu expedition. The entire team of climbers reaches the summit over the next two days.
 May 18 – Free movement of residents between North and South Vietnam ends.
 May 25 – Joe Brown and George Band are the first to reach the summit of Kangchenjunga in the Himalayas, as part of the British Kangchenjunga expedition led by Charles Evans.

June

 June 7 – The television quiz program The $64,000 Question premieres on CBS-TV in the United States, with Hal March as the host.
 June 11 – Le Mans disaster: Eighty-three people are killed and at least 100 are injured, after two race cars collide in the 1955 24 Hours of Le Mans.
 June 13 – Mir Mine, the first diamond mine in the Soviet Union, is discovered.
 June 16 – Lady and the Tramp, the Walt Disney company's 15th animated film, premieres in Chicago.
 June 26 – The Freedom Charter of the anti-apartheid South African Congress Alliance is adopted, at a Congress of the People in Kliptown.

July

 July 1 – Transformation from the Imperial Bank of India to the State Bank of India is given legal recognition through an Act of the Parliament of India.
 July 7 – The New Zealand Special Air Service is formed.
 July 13 – Ruth Ellis is hanged for murder in London, becoming the last woman ever to be executed in the United Kingdom.
 July 17
 The Disneyland theme park opens in Anaheim, California, an event broadcast on the American Broadcasting Company television network.
 The first atomic-generated electrical power is sold commercially, partially powering Arco, Idaho, from the U.S. National Reactor Testing Station; on July 18, Schenectady, New York, receives power from a prototype nuclear submarine reactor at Knolls Atomic Power Laboratory.
 July 18 – Illinois Governor William Stratton signs the Loyalty Oath Act, that mandates all public employees take a loyalty oath to the State of Illinois and the United States or lose their jobs.
 July 18–23 – Geneva Summit between the United States, Soviet Union, United Kingdom and France.
 July 22 – In Long Beach, California (United States), Hillevi Rombin of Sweden is crowned Miss Universe.
 July 27 – El Al Flight 402 from Vienna (Austria) to Tel Aviv, via Istanbul, is shot down over Bulgaria. All 58 passengers and crewmen aboard the Lockheed Constellation are killed.
 July 28 – The first Interlingua Congress is held in Tours, France, leading to the foundation of the Union Mundial pro Interlingua.

August

 August 1 – The prototype Lockheed U-2 reconnaissance aircraft first flies, in Nevada.
 August 18
 The First Sudanese Civil War begins.
 The first meeting of the Organization of Central American States (ODECA) is held, in Antigua Guatemala.
 August 19 – Hurricane Diane hits the northeastern United States, killing over 200 people and causing over $1 billion in damage.
 August 20 – Hundreds of people are killed in anti-French rioting in Morocco and Algeria.
 August 22 – Eleven schoolchildren are killed when their school bus is hit by a freight train in Spring City, Tennessee.
 August 25 – The last Soviet Army forces leave Austria.
 August 26 – Satyajit Ray's film Pather Panchali is released in India.
 August 27 – The first edition of the Guinness Book of Records is published, in London.
 August 28 – Black 14-year-old Emmett Till is lynched and shot in the head for allegedly whistling at a white woman in Money, Mississippi; his white murderers, Roy Bryant and J. W. Milam, are acquitted by an all-white jury.

September

 September 2 – Under the guidance of Dr. Humphry Osmond, Christopher Mayhew ingests 400 mg of mescaline hydrochloride and allows himself to be filmed as part of a Panorama special for BBC TV in the U.K. that is never broadcast.
 September 3 – Little Richard records "Tutti Frutti" in New Orleans; it is released in October.
 September 6 – Istanbul pogrom: Istanbul's Greek minority is the target of a government-sponsored pogrom.
 September 10 – The long-running Western television series Gunsmoke debuts, on the CBS network in the United States.
 September 14 – Pope Pius XII elevates many of the Apostolic vicariates in Africa to Metropolitan Archdioceses.
 September 15 – Vladimir Nabokov's controversial novel Lolita is published in Paris, by Olympia Press.
 September 16
 The military coup to unseat President Juan Perón of Argentina is launched at midnight.
 A Soviet Navy Zulu-class submarine becomes the first to launch a ballistic missile.
 September 18 – The United Kingdom formally annexes the uninhabited Atlantic island of Rockall.
 September 19–21 – President of Argentina Juan Perón is ousted in a military coup.
 September 19 – Hurricane Hilda kills about 200 people in Mexico.
 September 21–30 – Hurricane Janet, one of the strongest North Atlantic tropical cyclones on record, sweeps the Lesser Antilles and Mexico, causing more than 1,020 deaths.
 September 22 – Commercial television starts in the United Kingdom with the Independent Television Authority's first ITV franchises beginning broadcasting in London, ending the BBC monopoly.
 September 23: A 6.8 earthquake shakes the Chinese county of Huili, leaving 728 dead and 1,547 injured.
 September 24 – Dwight D. Eisenhower, President of the United States, suffers a coronary thrombosis while on vacation in Denver, Colorado. Vice President Nixon serves as Acting President while Eisenhower recovers.
 September 24 – the body of Glycine Watch SA founder Eugène Meylan, age 64, found stoned to death
 September 30 – Actor James Dean is killed when his automobile collides with another car at a highway junction, near Cholame, California.

October

 October 2 – Alfred Hitchcock Presents debuts on the CBS TV network in the United States.
 October 3 – The Mickey Mouse Club debuts on the ABC-TV network in the United States.
 October 4 – The Reverend Sun Myung Moon is released from prison in Seoul, South Korea.
 October 5 – Disneyland Hotel opens to the public in Anaheim, California.
 October 11 – 70-mm film for projection is introduced, with the theatrical release of Rodgers and Hammerstein's musical film, Oklahoma!.
 October 14 – The Organization of Central American States secretariat is inaugurated.
 October 20 – Disc jockey Bill Randle of WERE (Cleveland) is the key presenter of a concert at Brooklyn High School (Ohio), featuring Pat Boone and Bill Haley & His Comets, and opening with Elvis Presley (Elvis's first filmed performance), for a documentary on Randle titled The Pied Piper of Cleveland.
 October 26
 After the last Allied troops have left Austria, and following the provisions of the Austrian Independence Treaty, the country declares its permanent neutrality.
 Ngô Đình Diệm proclaims Vietnam to be a republic, with himself as its President (following the State of Vietnam referendum on October 23), and forms the Army of the Republic of Vietnam.
 October 27 – The film Rebel Without a Cause, starring James Dean, is released in the United States.
 October 29 – Soviet battleship Novorossiysk explodes at moorings in Sevastopol Bay, killing 608 (the Soviet Union's worst naval disaster to date).

November

 November 1
 Official start date of the Vietnam War between the Democratic Republic of Vietnam and Republic of Vietnam; the north is allied with the Viet Cong.
 A time bomb explodes in the cargo hold of United Airlines Flight 629, a Douglas DC-6B, over Longmont, Colorado, killing all 39 passengers and 5 crew members on board.
 November 3 – The Rimutaka Tunnel opens on the New Zealand Railways, at 5.46 mi (8.79 km), the longest in the Southern Hemisphere at this time.
 November 15 – The Democratic Party of Japan and Japan Liberal Party merge to form the Japan Liberal Democratic Party, beginning the "1955 System".
 November 19 – C. Northcote Parkinson first propounds 'Parkinson's law', in The Economist.
 November 20 – Bo Diddley makes his television debut on Ed Sullivan's Toast Of The Town show for the CBS-TV network in the United States.
 November 23 – The Cocos Islands in the Indian Ocean are transferred from British to Australian control.
 November 26 – The British Governor of Cyprus declares a state of emergency on the island.
 November 27 – The Westboro Baptist Church holds its first service in Topeka, Kansas.

December

 December 1 – In Montgomery, Alabama, Rosa Parks refuses to obey bus driver James F. Blake's order that she give up her seat to make room for a white passenger, and is arrested, leading to the Montgomery bus boycott.
 December 4 – The International Federation of Blood Donor Organizations is founded in Luxembourg.
 December 5
 The American Federation of Labor and the Congress of Industrial Organizations merge, to become the AFL–CIO.
 The Montgomery Improvement Association is formed in Montgomery, Alabama, by Dr. Martin Luther King Jr., and other Black ministers to coordinate the Montgomery bus boycott by Black people.
 December 9 – Adnan Menderes of DP forms the new government of Turkey (22nd government).
 December 10 – 1955 Australian federal election: Robert Menzies' Liberal/Country Coalition Government is re-elected with a substantially increased majority, defeating the Labor Party led by H. V. Evatt. This election comes in the immediate aftermath of the devastating split in the Labor Party, which leads to the formation of the Democratic Labor Party. The DLP will preference against Labor, and keep the Coalition in office until 1972.
 December 14
 The Tappan Zee Bridge over the Hudson River, in New York State, opens to traffic.
 Albania, Austria, Bulgaria, Cambodia, Finland, Hungary, Ireland, Italy, Jordan, Laos, Libya, Nepal, Portugal, Romania, Spain and Sri Lanka join the United Nations simultaneously, after several years of moratorium on admitting new members that began during the Korean War.
 December 20 – Cardiff is declared by the British Government as the capital of Wales.
 December 22 – American cytogeneticist Joe Hin Tjio discovers the correct number of human chromosomes, forty-six.
 December 31
 General Motors becomes the first American corporation to make a profit of over 1 billion dollars in 1 year.
 Austria becomes independent, under terms of the May 15 Austrian State Treaty.

World population
 World population: 2,755,823,000
 Africa: 246,746,000
 Asia: 1,541,947,000
 Europe: 575,184,000
 South America: 190,797,000
 North America: 186,884,000
 Oceania: 14,265,000

Births

January

 January 1
 Mario Andreacchio, Australian film director
 Bonnie Arnold, American film producer
 Mary Beard, English classicist
 Akissi Kouamé, Ivorian army general (d. 2022)
 Simon Schaffer, English academic and historian of science and philosophy
 Mulatu Teshome, Ethiopian politician and 8th President of Ethiopia
 January 4 – Mark Hollis, English musician (d. 2019)
 January 5 – Mamata Banerjee, Indian politician, Chief Minister of West Bengal
 January 6 – Rowan Atkinson, English comic actor
 January 7 – Belinda Meuldijk, Dutch actress 
 January 8 – Mike Reno, Canadian musician
 January 9 
 Michiko Kakutani, American literary critic
 J. K. Simmons, American actor
 January 10 
 Michael Schenker, German guitarist (Scorpions, UFO, Michael Schenker Group)
 Jimmy Vivino, American guitarist
 January 12 – Kerry-Lynne Findlay, Canadian politician
 January 13
 Paul Kelly, Australian musician
 Jay McInerney, American writer
 January 15
 Andreas Gursky, German photographer
 Enrico Mentana, Italian journalist 
 January 16 
 Mary Karr, American poet
 J. S. G. Boggs, American artist
 January 17 – Steve Earle, American musician
 January 18
 Kevin Costner, American actor, producer and director
 Frankie Knuckles, American disk jockey and record producer (d. 2014)
 Marilyn Mazur, Danish percussionist
 January 19
 Sir Simon Rattle, English orchestral conductor
 Paul Rodriguez, Mexican American actor and comedian
 January 20 – Wyatt Knight, American actor (d. 2011)
 January 21 – Jeff Koons, American artist
 January 22 – Sonja Morgenstern, German figure skater
 January 25 – Olivier Assayas, French film director
 January 26
 Björn Andrésen, Swedish actor
 Eddie Van Halen, Dutch-American rock musician (Van Halen) (d. 2020)
 Lucía Méndez, Mexican film actress
 January 27
 John Roberts, Chief Justice of the United States
 Ratnottama Sengupta, Indian journalist
 January 28
 Vinod Khosla, Indian-born American venture capitalist
 Nicolas Sarkozy, 23rd President of France
 January 29
 Rachid Mouffouk, Algerian sculptor
 Femi Pedro, Deputy Governor of Lagos State, Nigeria
 January 30 – Mychal Thompson, Bahamian basketball player
 January 31 – Virginia Ruzici, Romanian tennis player

February

 February 1 – Hans Werner Olm, German television and film comedian
 February 2 – Leszek Engelking, Polish poet, writer and translator (d. 2022) 
 February 3 
 Kirsty Wark, Scottish television presenter
 February 4 – Joseph D. Kernan, American military officer, Under Secretary of Defense for Intelligence 
 February 6
 Michael Pollan, American journalist
 Irinej Dobrijević, American-born Serbian Bishop of Australia and New Zealand
 February 7 – Miguel Ferrer, American actor (d. 2017)
 February 8
 Janusz Cisek, Polish historian (d. 2020) 
 Jim Neidhart, American professional wrestler (d. 2018)
 John Grisham, American novelist
 Ethan Phillips, American actor 
 Xu Bing, Chinese artist 
 February 9 – Charles Shaughnessy, English actor
 February 10
 Chris Adams, English wrestler and judoka (d. 2001)
 Pablo Borges Delgado, Cuban artist 
 Jim Cramer, American television personality
 Greg Norman, Australian golfer  
 February 12 
 David Owen Brooks, American convicted murderer (d. 2020)
 Bill Laswell, American bass guitarist 
 February 13 – Hank Risan, American scientist 
 February 14 
 Guillermo Francella, Argentine actor 
 Mitsuhisa Taguchi, Japanese footballer (d. 2019) 
 February 15
 Janice Dickinson, American model, photographer, author and talent agent
 Christopher McDonald, American actor
 February 16 – Bradley Byrne, American business attorney and politician, Alabama
 February 17 – Mo Yan, Chinese writer
 February 18 – Cheetah Chrome, American musician 
 February 19 
 Jeff Daniels, American actor 
 Siri Hustvedt, American novelist
 February 20 – Mack Wilberg, American composer
 February 21 – Kelsey Grammer, American actor and comedian
 February 22 – David Axelrod, American political analyst
 February 23 – Flip Saunders, American basketball coach (d. 2015)
 February 24
 Deborah Coyne, Canadian constitutional lawyer
 Steve Jobs, American businessman and founder of Apple Computer (d. 2011) 
 Alain Prost, French four-time Formula 1 world champion
 February 25 – Leann Hunley, American television actress
 February 27 – Grady Booch, American software engineer
 February 28 – Gilbert Gottfried, American comedian and actor (d. 2022)

March

 March 1
 Sir Timothy Laurence, English vice admiral and second husband of Anne, Princess Royal
 Denis Mukwege, Congolese gynecologist, Nobel Peace Prize laureate
 March 2 – Shoko Asahara, Japanese cult leader (Aum Shinrikyo) (d. 2018)
 March 3 – Kent Derricott, Canadian TV personality in Japan
 March 4 – Dominique Pinon, French actor
 March 5
 Julien Dray, French politician
 Penn Jillette, American magician and comedian (Penn & Teller)
 Deddy Mizwar, Indonesian politician, actor, movie Director
 March 6
 Wendy Boglioli, American Olympic gold medallist swimmer (1976)
 Jay Ilagan, Filipino actor (d. 1992)
 Cyprien Ntaryamira, Burundian politician, 5th President of Burundi (d. 1994)
 Alberta Watson, Canadian actress (d. 2015)
 March 7
 Michael Jan Friedman, American novelist and comic book writer
 Tommy Kramer, American football player
 March 8 – Don Ashby, Canadian ice hockey player (d. 1981)
 March 9
 Ornella Muti, Italian actress
 Franco Uncini, Italian motorcycle racer
 March 10
 Yousra, Egyptian actress and singer
 Marianne Rosenberg, German singer
 March 11 – Nina Hagen, German pop singer
 March 12 – Richard Martini, American film director
 March 13
 Bruno Conti, Italian football player
 Gail Grandchamp, American female boxer
 Glenne Headly, American actress of film, stage and television (d. 2017)
 March 14 – Stephen R. Bissette, American comics artist
 March 15
 Robert Kabbas, Egyptian-born Australian Olympic silver medallist weightlifter
 Dee Snider, American rock singer (Twisted Sister)
 March 16
 Bruno Barreto, Brazilian film director
 Jiro Watanabe, Japanese former world super flyweight champion boxer
 March 17
 Cynthia McKinney, American politician, activist
 Gary Sinise, American actor, producer and director
 March 18
 Carlos Enrique Trinidad Gómez, Guatemalan Roman Catholic prelate (d. 2018)
 Guillermo Dávila, Venezuelan actor and singer
 Dwayne Murphy, American baseball player
 March 19
 Pino Daniele, Italian music artist (d. 2015)
 Bruce Willis, American actor
 Simon Yam, Hong Kong actor
 March 20
 Eric Schiller, American chess player and author (d. 2018)
 Mariya Takeuchi, Japanese singer-songwriter
 March 21
 Jair Bolsonaro, Brazilian congressman and politician, 38th President of Brazil
 Philippe Troussier, French football coach
 Bärbel Wöckel, East German sprinter
 March 22
 Lena Olin, Swedish actress
 Pete Sessions, American politician
 Valdis Zatlers, 7th President of Latvia
 March 23 
 Moses Malone, American basketball player (d. 2015)
 Susan Schwab, American politician, who served under President George W. Bush as United States Trade Representative
 March 24
 Kim Johnston Ulrich, American actress
 Candy Reynolds, American tennis player
 Celâl Şengör, Turkish geologist
 March 25 – Wendy Larry, American head coach of the Old Dominion University Lady Monarchs women's basketball team 
 March 26 – Danny Arndt, Canadian ice hockey player
 March 27 – Mariano Rajoy, Prime Minister of Spain
 March 28 – Reba McEntire, American country singer and actress
 March 29
 Earl Campbell, American football player
 Margaret I. Cuomo, American radiologist
 Brendan Gleeson, Irish actor
 Christopher Lawford, American author, actor and activist (d. 2018)
 Marina Sirtis, English actress
 March 30
 Marilou Diaz-Abaya, Filipina film director (d. 2012)
 Randy VanWarmer, American singer-songwriter (d. 2004)
 Humberto Vélez, Mexican voice actor
 March 31
 Philip Dimitrov, Bulgarian politician 
 Angus Young, lead guitarist of Australian rock group AC/DC

April

 April 1 – Ockie Oosthuizen, South African rugby union player (d. 2019)
 April 2 
 Sirindhorn, Princess Royal of Thailand 
 Chellie Pingree, Democratic politician, Maine's 1st congressional district 
 April 3 – Mick Mars, American rock guitarist (Mötley Crüe)
 April 5 – Akira Toriyama, Japanese manga artist
 April 6 – Michael Rooker, American actor
 April 7
 Bruno Zaremba, French footballer (d. 2018)
 Grace Hightower, American philanthropist, actress and singer
 Gregg Jarrett, American lawyer turned journalist
 Akira Nishino, Japanese soccer player and manager
 Werner Stocker, German actor (d. 1993)
 April 8
 Kane Hodder, American actor
 Barbara Kingsolver, American fiction writer
 April 9 – Kate Heyhoe, American food writer
 April 10 – Philip J. Hanlon, American mathematician and computer science, 18th President of Dartmouth College
 April 11 – Kevin Brady, American politician, Texas's 8th congressional district
 April 12 – Fred Ryan, chief executive officer of The Washington Post
 April 13
 Steve Camp, American Christian musician
 Hideki Saijo, Japanese singer and actor (d. 2018)
 April 14 – Don Roos, American screenwriter
 April 15 
 Tommy Castro, American blues guitarist
 Dodi Fayed, Egyptian film producer (d. 1997)
 Jeff Golub, American jazz guitarist (d. 2015) 
 April 16
 Henri, Grand Duke of Luxembourg
 DJ Kool Herc, Jamaican American DJ
 April 17
 Rob Bolland, Dutch musician, songwriter and music producer (Bolland & Bolland)
 Pete Shelley, English punk rock singer-songwriter, musician (Buzzcocks) (d. 2018)
 Dave VanDam, American voice actor and impressionist (d. 2018)
 April 18 – Bobby Castillo, American baseball player (d. 2014)
 April 20
 Rotimi Fani-Kayode, Nigerian-born British photographer (d. 1989)
 Svante Pääbo, Swedish evolutionary geneticist, recipient of the Nobel Prize in Physiology or Medicine
 April 21
 Ebiet G. Ade, Indonesian singer and songwriter
 Toninho Cerezo, Brazilian footballer and coach
 April 23
 Judy Davis, Australian actress
 Ludovikus Simanullang, Indonesian Roman Catholic bishop (d. 2018)
 Fumi Hirano, Japanese voice actress and essayist
 Tony Miles, English chess player (d. 2001)
 April 24 – John de Mol, Dutch media tycoon
 April 25
 Karon O. Bowdre, United States District Judge of the United States District Court for the Northern District of Alabama.
 John Nunn, English chess player and mathematician
 Parviz Parastui, Iranian actor
 April 26 – Chen Daoming, Chinese actor
 April 27
 James Risen, American Pulitzer Prize-winning investigative reporter and author
 Eric Schmidt, American software engineer and businessman, CEO of Google (2001-2011)
 Jing Yidan, Chinese former television host
 April 28 
 Saeb Erekat, Palestinian diplomat (d. 2020)
 Eddie Jobson, English musician
 April 29
 Richard Epcar, American voice actor
 Kate Mulgrew, American actress
 Yūko Tanaka, Japanese actress
 April 30 – Zlatko Topčić, Bosnian writer and screenwriter

May

 May 2
 Willie Miller, Scottish footballer
 Donatella Versace, Italian designer
 Dave Winer, American software pioneer
 May 4
 Avram Grant, Israeli football manager
 Robert Ellis Orrall, American singer
 May 6 – Tom Bergeron, American television host
 May 7 – Peter Reckell, American actor
 May 8 
 Betsy Baker, American actress
 Meles Zenawi, 10th Prime Minister of Ethiopia and 3rd President of Ethiopia (d. 2012)
 May 9
 Kevin Peter Hall, American actor (d. 1991)
 Anne Sofie von Otter, Swedish mezzo-soprano
 May 10
 Chris Berman, American sports broadcaster
 Mark David Chapman, American murderer of musician John Lennon
 May 14
 Big Van Vader, American professional wrestler and football player (d. 2018)
 Dave Hoover, American comic book artist and animator (d. 2011)
 Robert Tapert, American television producer
 May 15
 Mohamed Brahmi, Tunisian politician (assassinated 2013)
 Lee Horsley,  American film, television and theater actor
 Hege Skjeie, Norwegian political scientist and feminist (d. 2018)
 May 16
 Olga Korbut, Soviet gymnast
 Olli Kortekangas, Finnish composer
 Jack Morris, American baseball player
 Richard Phillips, American merchant mariner and captain of the MV Maersk Alabama
 Debra Winger, American actress
 May 17 – Bill Paxton, American actor (d. 2017)
 May 18 – Chow Yun-fat, Hong Kong actor
 May 19
 Mark Staff Brandl, American and Swiss artist and art historian
 James Gosling, Canadian software engineer
 Th. Emil Homerin, American theologian
 May 20
 Diego Abatantuono, Italian actor
 Steve George, American keyboardist and singer
 Zbigniew Preisner, Polish film composer
 May 21 – Sergei Shoigu, Russian politician, (Russian Defence Minister) 
 May 22
 Chalmers Alford, American jazz guitarist (d. 2008)
 Iva Davies, Australian singer and musician; lead singer of Icehouse
 Dale Winton, English radio DJ and television presenter (d. 2018)
 May 24 – Rosanne Cash, American entertainer
 May 25 – Connie Sellecca, American actress
 May 26 – Doris Dörrie, German actress and screenplay writer
 May 27 – Richard Schiff, American actor and comedian
 May 29
 John Hinckley Jr., attempted assassin of Ronald Reagan
 Mike Porcaro, American bass guitarist (Toto) (d. 2015)
 May 30
 Brian Kobilka, American physiologist
 Paresh Rawal, Indian actor
 Colm Tóibín, Irish novelist
 May 31
 Tommy Emmanuel, Australian guitarist
 Susie Essman, American actress
 Lynne Truss, English writer

June

 June 1  
Chiyonofuji Mitsugu, Japanese sumo wrestler (58th Yokozuna grand champion) (d. 2016)
David Schultz, American professional wrestler
 June 2 – Dana Carvey, American actor and comedian
 June 3 – Daniel Filmus, Argentine politician, member of the Chamber of Deputies of Argentina
 June 4
 Precious, Canadian professional wrestling valet
 Mary Testa, American film actress
 June 5 – Fernando Borrego Linares, Cuban singer and songwriter (aka Polo Montañez)
 June 6
 Sandra Bernhard, American comedian, actress, author and singer
 Chris Nyman, American baseball player
 Sam Simon, American filmmaker (d. 2015)
 June 7
 Jo Gilbert, English film producer and casting director (d. 2018)
 Bob Beatty, American football coach
 Tim Richmond, American race car driver (d. 1989)
 June 8
 Duke Aiona, 10th Lieutenant Governor of Hawaii
 Tim Berners-Lee, English computer scientist and World Wide Web inventor
 Griffin Dunne, American actor and director
 June 10
 Floyd Bannister, American baseball player
 Andrew Stevens, American actor, producer and director
 June 11 – Yuriy Sedykh, Ukrainian hammer thrower (d. 2021)
 June 12- Jagadish Kumar, Indian Malayalam film actor
 June 12 – William Langewiesche, American author
 June 13 – John E. Jones III, American justice
 June 14
 Tito Rojas, Puerto Rican salsa singer and songwriter (d. 2020)
 Kim Lankford, American actress, businesswoman and horse wrangler
 Paul O'Grady (also known as "Lily Savage"), English talk show host and comedian
 June 15
 István Levente Garai, Hungarian physician and politician (d. 2018)
 Polly Draper, American actress, screenwriter, playwright, producer and director
 David A. Kennedy, son of Robert F. Kennedy (d. 1984)
 June 16 – Laurie Metcalf, American actress
 June 18 – Sandy Allen, American, world's tallest woman (d. 2008)
 June 20 – Tor Nørretranders, Danish author
 June 21
 Aloysius Amwano, Nauruan politician
 Tim Bray, Canadian computer programmer
 Jean-Pierre Mader, French singer-songwriter
 Leigh McCloskey, American actor
 Michel Platini, French retired football player and President of UEFA
 June 22 – Choi Kyoung-hwan, South Korean politician; Prime Minister of South Korea
 June 23
 Jean Tigana, Malian-French international footballer
 Glenn Danzig, American rock singer (The Misfits, Samhain, Danzig)
 June 24 – Nobuhiro Kiyotaki, Japanese economist and professor
 June 25 – Víctor Manuel Vucetich, Mexican footballer and manager
 June 26
 Gedde Watanabe, American actor and comedian
 Yoko Gushiken, Japanese former WBA light flyweight champion boxer
 June 27 – Isabelle Adjani, French actress
 June 30 – Egils Levits, President of Latvia

July

 July 1
 Sanma Akashiya, Japanese comedian and actor
 Nikolai Demidenko, Russian born British classical pianist
 Christian Estrosi, French sportsman and politician
 Li Keqiang, Premier of the People's Republic of China
 Lisa Scottoline, American novelist
 July 2
 Andrew Divoff, Venezuelan actor
 Stephen Walt, American political scientist
 Sylvie Le Noach, French swimmer
 Randy Burchell, Canadian professional ice hockey goaltender
 Chau Giang, Vietnamese-born American professional poker player
 Proceso Alcala, Filipino politician
 July 3
 Bruce Altman, American actor
 John Cramer, American game show announcer
 Matt Keough, American baseball player (d. 2020)
 July 4
 Eero Heinäluoma, Finnish politician
 Víctor Reymundo Nájera, Mexican politician
 July 5
 Sebastian Barry, Irish playwright, novelist and poet
 Shannon Bell, Canadian performance philosopher
 Mia Couto, Mozambican writer
 Muhammad Aslam Khan Raisani, Pakistani politician
 Henry Lee Summer, American singer
 July 6 – Sherif Ismail, Former Prime Minister of Egypt (d. 2023)
 July 7
 Paul Bahoken, Cameroonian footballer
 Rolf Saxon, American actor
 Ludo Vika, Dominican actress
 July 8
 Vladislava Milosavljević, Serbian actress
 Mihaela Mitrache, Romanian actress
 July 9
 Lindsey Graham, American politician, lawyer, U.S. Army soldier, U.S. Senator (R-Sc.) and unsuccessful 2016 presidential candidate
 Fred Norris, American radio personality
 Jimmy Smits, American actor
 July 10
 Andrea Bruce, Jamaican athlete
 Vinnie Curto, American professional boxer
 Ray Goff, American football player and coach
 Dan Newhouse, American politician
 July 11
 Balaji Sadasivan, Singaporean politician and neurosurgeon
 Søren Sætter-Lassen, Danish actor
 July 12
 Timothy Garton Ash, English modern historian
 Nina Gunke, Swedish actress
 Tadashi Miyazawa, Japanese voice actor
 July 13 – Yoshitaka Tamba, Japanese actor
 July 14 – Ramon Jimenez Jr., Filipino attorney (d. 2020)
 July 15
 Željko Burić, Croatian politician and doctor
 Didier Etumba, Congolese Army general
 Pooran Prakash, Indian politician
 July 16
 Zohar Argov, Israeli singer (d. 1987)
 Patrick Bernasconi, French business executive
 Ritva Elomaa, Finnish professional female bodybuilding champion, pop singer and politician
 Janet Huckabee, American politician
 Saw Swee Leong, Malaysian badminton player
 July 17
 Janina Buzūnaitė-Žukaitienė, Lithuanian painter, poet, creator of accessories and metal sculptures
 Fei Yu-ching, Taiwanese singer-songwriter
 Sylvie Léonard, French-Canadian actress
 Alvin Slaughter, American gospel singer-songwriter and worship leader
 July 18
 Bernd Fasching, Austrian painter and sculptor
 György Matolcsy, Hungarian politician and economist
 Sergey Zimov, Russian geophysicist and creator of Pleistocene Park
 July 19 – Karen Cheryl, French singer, actress, radio and television presenter
 July 20 – Edgar Zambrano, Venezuelan lawyer and politician
 July 21
 Adrienne King, American actress
 Dannel Malloy, American politician
 Howie Epstein, American musician and producer (d. 2003)
 Béla Tarr, Hungarian film director
 July 22
 Gbenga Bareehu Ashafa, Nigerian politician
 Willem Dafoe, American actor
 July 25 – Iman, Somalian model
 July 26
 Michele Pillar, American Christian musician
 Asif Ali Zardari, 11th President of Pakistan
 July 27 – Allan Border, Australian cricketer
 July 31 – Jakie Quartz, French singer

August

 August 1 – Paul Shrubb, English professional footballer, coach and scout (d. 2020)
 August 2
 John Battaglia, American convicted murderer (d. 2018)
 Caleb Carr, American writer
 August 3
 Corey Burton, American voice actor
 Roger Gifford, Lord Mayor of London 2013
 August 4
 Gerrie Coetzee, South African boxer, 1983-1984 WBA heavyweight champion.
 Billy Bob Thornton, American actor, director and screenwriter
 August 6
 Gordon J. Brand, English golfer (d. 2020)
 Ron Davis, American baseball player
 Earl "Chinna" Smith, Jamaican Reggae guitarist
 August 7
 Wayne Knight, American actor and comedian
 Vladimir Sorokin, Russian writer
 August 8 – Diddú, Icelandic soprano and songwriter
 August 9 – Doug Williams, American football quarterback
 August 10 – Mel Tiangco, Filipina television anchor, journalist and humanitarian
 August 12
 Heintje Simons, Dutch singer and actor
 Gish Jen, American fiction writer
 August 13 – Daryl, American magician (d. 2017)
 August 17 – Richard Hilton, American businessman
 August 19
 Peter Gallagher, American actor
 Terry Harper, American baseball player
 Apisai Ielemia, 10th Prime Minister of Tuvalu
 August 20 – Agnes Chan, Hong Kong-born TV personality in Japan
 August 22
 Chiranjeevi, Indian actor
 Gordon Liu, Chinese actor
 August 24 – Mike Huckabee, American politician, Governor and 2008 Presidential candidate
 August 25 – John McGeoch, Scottish musician (d. 2004)
 August 27
 Laura Fygi, Dutch singer
 Diana Scarwid, American actress
 Sergey Khlebnikov, Soviet speed skater (d. 1999)
 August 30
 Mayumi Muroyama, Japanese manga artist
 Andy Pask, English bass player and composer (Landscape)
 Helge Schneider, comedian, jazz musician and multi-instrumentalist, author, film and theatre director
 August 31 – Edwin Moses, American athlete

September

 September 1
 Billy Blanks, American martial artist; inventor of the Tae Bo exercise program
 Bruce Foxton, English musician
 September 2
 Robert Duncan, American astrophysicist
 Claus Kleber, German television journalist
 Natalya Petrusyova, Soviet speed skater
 Michelle Yim, Hong Kong actress
 September 4
 David Broza, Israeli singer-songwriter and activist
 Teodor Frunzeti, Romanian general
 Hiroshi Izawa, Japanese actor
 September 6 – Raymond Benson, American author
 September 7 – Efim Zelmanov, Russian mathematician
 September 9
 Edward Hibbert, English-American actor and literary agent
 John Kricfalusi, Canadian cartoonist
 Ivan Smirnov, Russian composer and guitar player (d. 2018)
 September 12 – Peter Scolari, American actor and comedian
 September 13 – Dan Ghica-Radu, Romanian general
 September 14 – Daniella Levine Cava, American lawyer and politician
 September 15
 Željka Antunović, Croatian politician
 Brendan O'Carroll, Irish actor and comedian
 Bruce Reitherman, American filmmaker and voice actor
 Renzo Rosso, Italian clothing designer
 September 16 – Robin Yount, American baseball player
 September 17
 Marina Lima, Brazilian singer and songwriter
 Charles Martinet, American voice-actor
 September 18 – Bob Papenbrook, American voice actor (d. 2006)
 September 19 – Richard Burmer, American composer, sound designer and musician (d. 2006)
 September 21
 Richard Hieb, American astronaut
 Israel Katz, Israeli politician
 September 24 – Shinbo Nomura, Japanese manga artist
 September 25
 Zucchero Fornaciari, Italian singer-songwriter
 Karl-Heinz Rummenigge, German football player
 September 28 – Stéphane Dion, Canadian politician
 September 29 
 Joe Donnelly, American politician
 Gwen Ifill, American journalist (d. 2016)
 September 30
 Janet Arceo, Mexican actress, TV presenter, announcer, director and businesswoman (Doña Eduviges in El Chavo del Ocho)
 Andy Bechtolsheim, German electrical engineer and co-founder of Sun Microsystems.

October

 October 1 – P. B. Abdul Razak, Indian politician (d. 2018)
 October 2 – Philip Oakey, English synth-pop singer-songwriter (The Human League)
 October 3 – Tommy Wiseau, American film director and actor (The Room)
 October 4 – Dane Sorensen, New Zealand rugby league player 
 October 5
 Bart D. Ehrman, American religious studies scholar and writer, specialist in textual criticism
 Jean-Jacques Lafon, French singer-songwriter
 Caroline Loeb, French singer and actress
 October 6 – Wang Huning, Chinese politician
 October 7 – Yo-Yo Ma, French-born Chinese American cellist
 October 8
 Bill Elliott, American racing driver
 Darrell Hammond, Comedian (Saturday Night Live)
 October 12 – Pat DiNizio, American singer-songwriter (The Smithereens) (d. 2017)
 October 13 – Sergei Shepelev, Russian ice hockey player
 October 15
 James B. Aguayo-Martel, Mexican-born physician, surgeon, scientist and inventor
 Kulbir Bhaura, Indian-born British field hockey player
 Emily Yoffe, American journalist and advice columnist
 October 17 – Tyrone Mitchell, American murderer (d. 1984)
 October 18
 Hiromi Go, Japanese singer
 Timmy Mallett, English television presenter
 October 19
 Lonnie Shelton, American basketball player (d. 2018)
 LaSalle Ishii, Japanese television personality
 Roland Dyens, French classical guitarist and composer (d. 2016)
 Dan Gutman, American writer
 October 20
 Tony Hanson, American basketball player (d. 2018)
 Thomas Newman, American composer
 October 21
 Yasukazu Hamada, Japanese politician
 Rich Mullins, American Christian musician (d. 1997)
 October 24
 Karen Austin, American actress
 Katherine Knight, Australian mariticide
 October 25
 Glynis Barber, South African-born British actress
 Gale Anne Hurd, American film and television producer
 October 28
 Bill Gates, American businessman and co-founder of Microsoft
 Indra Nooyi, Indian business executive
 October 29
 Kevin DuBrow, American rock singer (d. 2007)
 Roger O'Donnell, English rock keyboardist
 Etsuko Shihomi, Japanese actress

November

 November 1 – Joe Arroyo, Colombian salsa and tropical music singer (d. 2011)
 November 3
 Howard Michaels, American businessman (d. 2018)
 Teresa De Sio, Italian singer-songwriter
 Phil Simms, American football player
 Yukihiko Tsutsumi, Japanese film director
 November 4
 Rita Bhaduri, Indian actress (d. 2018)
 Ghousavi Shah, Sufi teacher and author, Secretary General of The Conference of World Religions
 Matti Vanhanen, Prime Minister of Finland
 November 5
 Pedro Brieger, Argentine journalist and sociologist.
 Kris Jenner, American television personality
 Karan Thapar, Indian journalist, political analyst and commentator
 November 6 – Maria Shriver, American television journalist, host; First Lady of California
 November 7
 Al Attles, American basketball player and coach
 Norbert Eder, German footballer (d. 2019)
 Paul Romer, American economist, Nobel Memorial Prize in Economic Sciences laureate
 Detlef Ultsch, German judo athlete
 November 9 – Karen Dotrice, Guernsey-born child actress
 November 10 – Roland Emmerich, German film director
 November 11 – Jigme Singye Wangchuck, King of Bhutan
 November 13 – Whoopi Goldberg, American actress and comedian
 November 14
 Koichi Nakano, Japanese bicycle racer
 Jack Sikma, American basketball player
 November 15 – Idris Jusoh, Malaysian politician ; Former Chief Minister Of Terengganu
 November 16 – Guillermo Lasso, President of Ecuador
 November 17
 Bill Macatee, American sports broadcaster
 Yolanda King, African-American actress and activist (d. 2007)
 November 19 – Dianne de Leeuw, Dutch figure skater
 November 20 – Ray Ozzie, American computer programmer
 November 21
 Kyle Gann, American composer and music critic
 Cedric Maxwell, American basketball player
 November 23
 Steven Brust, American fantasy author
 Peter Douglas, American television and film producer
 Ludovico Einaudi, Italian pianist and composer
 Mary Landrieu, American politician, U.S. Senator from Louisiana
 November 24
 Sir Ian Botham, English cricketer
 Najib Mikati, Lebanese politician, 2-Time Prime Minister of Lebanon
 November 25 – Bruno Tonioli, film, music video and theater choreographer
 November 26 – 
Tracy Hickman, American author
Jelko Kacin,  Slovenian politician, Member of the European Parliament
 November 27 – Bill Nye, American science presenter and public television host
 November 28 – Alessandro Altobelli, Italian football player
 November 29 – Howie Mandel, Canadian actor and game show host
 November 30
 Michael Beschloss, American historian
 Billy Idol, born William Broad, British rock musician

December

 December 3
 Melody Anderson, Canadian actress and social worker
 Steven Culp, American actor
 Warren Jeffs, American criminal
 Andrea Romano, American casting director, voice director, and voice actress
 December 4 – Maurizio Bianchi, Italian musician
 December 9 – Janusz Kupcewicz, Polish footballer (d. 2022)
 December 10 – Ana Gabriel, Mexican singer and songwriter 
 December 12 – Gianna Angelopoulos-Daskalaki, Greek politician and businesswoman
 December 13 – Manohar Parrikar, Indian politician (d. 2019)
 December 14 – Hervé Guibert, French writer and photographer (d. 1991)
 December 16 – Xander Berkeley, American actor
 December 17 – Brad Davis, American basketball player
 December 21 – Jane Kaczmarek, American actress
 December 23
 Keith Comstock, American baseball player
 Carol Ann Duffy, Scottish poet
 Stefan Arngrim, Canadian actor
 December 24
 Mizuho Fukushima, Japanese politician
 Clarence Gilyard, American actor and college professor
 December 27 – Barbara Olson, American television commentator (d. 2001)
 December 28 – Liu Xiaobo, Chinese literary critic and human rights activist, Nobel Peace Prize laureate (d. 2017)
 December 31 – Jim Tracy, American baseball player and manager

Deaths

January

 January 1 – Shanti Swaroop Bhatnagar, Indian scientist (b. 1894)
 January 2 – José Antonio Remón Cantera, 19th President of Panama (assassinated) (b. 1908)
 January 6 – Yevgeny Tarle, Soviet historian (b. 1874)
 January 11 – Rodolfo Graziani, Italian general (b. 1882)
 January 15
 Johannes Baader, German artist (b. 1875)
 Yves Tanguy, French painter (b. 1900)
 January 21 – Archie Hahn, American athlete (b. 1880)
 January 22 – Jonni Myyrä, Finnish-American athlete (b. 1892)
 January 24 – Ira Hayes, U.S. Marine flag raiser on Iwo Jima (b. 1923)
 January 29 – Hans Hedtoft, 14th Prime Minister of Denmark (b. 1903)
 January 31 – John Mott, American YMCA leader, recipient of the Nobel Peace Prize (b. 1865)

February

 February 3 - Vasily Blokhin, Soviet executioner (b. 1895)
 February 6 – Constantin Argetoianu, 41st Prime Minister of Romania (b. 1871)
 February 10 – Mokichi Okada, Japanese religious leader (b. 1882)
 February 11 – Ona Munson, American actress (b. 1903)
 February 12
 Tom Moore, Irish-American film actor (b. 1883)
 S. Z. Sakall, Hungarian actor (b. 1883)
 February 20 – Oswald Avery, American physician and medical researcher (b. 1877)
 February 23 – Paul Claudel, French poet, dramatist, and diplomat (b. 1868)
 February 27 – Trixie Friganza, American actress (b. 1870)

March

 March 3 – Katharine Drexel, American Roman Catholic foundress and saint (b. 1858)
 March 8 – William C. deMille, American screenwriter and director (b. 1878)
 March 9 
 Miroslava Stern, Czechoslovakian-Mexican actress (b. 1926)
 Matthew Henson, American explorer (b. 1866)
 March 11 – Sir Alexander Fleming, Scottish scientist, recipient of the Nobel Prize in Physiology or Medicine (b. 1881)
 March 12 – Charlie Parker, American saxophonist (b. 1920)
 March 14 – Ruth Poll, American lyricist and music publisher (b. 1899)
 March 16 – Nicolas de Staël, Russian painter (b. 1914)
 March 19 – Mihály Károlyi, 1st President of Hungary and 20th Prime Minister of Hungary (b. 1875)
 March 23 – Arthur Bernardes, 12th President of Brazil (b. 1875)
 March 24 – John W. Davis, American politician, diplomat, and lawyer (b. 1873)

April

 April 5 – Tibor Szele, Hungarian mathematician (b. 1918)
 April 7 – Theda Bara, American film actress (b. 1885)
 April 10 – Pierre Teilhard de Chardin, French Jesuit priest, philosopher, paleontologist and geologist (b. 1881)
 April 13 – Peyton C. March, United States Army general (b. 1864)
 April 18 – Albert Einstein, German-born physicist, Nobel Prize laureate (b. 1879)
 April 19 – Jim Corbett, Anglo-Indian hunter, conservationist and author (b. 1875)
 April 24 – Alfred Polgar, Austrian-born journalist (b. 1873)
 April 25 – Constance Collier, English actress and acting coach (b. 1878)
 April 30 – John Henry Towers, American admiral and naval aviation pioneer (b. 1885)

May

 May 2 – Alexander Hore-Ruthven, 1st Earl of Gowrie, 10th Governor-General of Australia (b. 1872)
 May 4
 Louis Charles Breguet, French aircraft designer and builder and early aviation pioneer (b. 1880)
 George Enescu, Romanian composer (b. 1881)
 May 10 
 Tommy Burns, Canadian boxer (b. 1881)
 John Radecki, Australian stained-glass artist (b. 1865)
 May 11 – Gilbert Jessop, English cricketer (b. 1874)
 May 15 – Harry J. Capehart, American lawyer, politician, and businessperson (b. 1881)
 May 14 – Charles Pelot Summerall, American general (b. 1867)
 May 16 – James Agee, American writer (b. 1909)
 May 17 – Owen Roberts, American jurist (b. 1875)
 May 18 – Mary McLeod Bethune, American educator (b. 1875)
 May 19 – Concha Espina, Spanish writer (b. 1869)
 May 26 – Alberto Ascari, Italian race-car driver (accident) (b. 1918)
 May 29 – Rudolf Klein-Rogge, German actor (b. 1885)
 May 30 – Bill Vukovich, American race-car driver (accident) (b. 1918)

June

 June 3 – Barbara Graham, American criminal (executed) (b. 1923)
 June 10 – Margaret Abbott, American golfer (b. 1878)
 June 11 – Walter Hampden, American actor (b. 1879)
 June 12 – Redcliffe N. Salaman, British botanist (b. 1874)
June 13 - Walter Braemer, German Nazi war criminal (b. 1883)
 June 17 – Carlyle Blackwell, American actor (b. 1884)
 June 26 – Engelbert Zaschka, German helicopter pioneer (b. 1895)
 June 29 – Max Pechstein, German painter (b. 1881)

July

 July 9 – Adolfo de la Huerta, 38th President of Mexico (b. 1881)
 July 13
 Ruth Ellis, British-born murderer, last woman to be executed in the United Kingdom (b. 1926)
 Stanley Price, American film and television actor (b. 1892)
 July 20 – Calouste Gulbenkian, Armenian businessman and philanthropist (b. 1869)
 July 23 – Cordell Hull, United States Secretary of State, recipient of the Nobel Peace Prize (b. 1871)
 July 25 – Isaak Dunayevsky, Soviet film composer and conductor (b. 1900)
 July 31 – Robert Francis, American actor (b. 1930)

August

 August 1 – William Hamilton, American Olympic athlete (b. 1883)
 August 2
 Rupprecht, Crown Prince of Bavaria, Bavarian military leader and last Bavarian crown prince (b. 1869)
 Wallace Stevens, American poet (b. 1879)
 August 5 – Carmen Miranda, Portuguese-born Brazilian singer and actress (b. 1909)
 August 11 – Frank Seiberling, American inventor, co-founder of Goodyear Tire & Rubber Company (b. 1859)
 August 12
 Thomas Mann, German novelist, Nobel Prize laureate (b. 1875)
 James B. Sumner, American chemist, Nobel Prize laureate (b. 1887)
 August 13 – Florence Easton, English opera soprano (b. 1882)
 August 17 – Fernand Léger, French painter and sculptor (b. 1881)
 August 28 – Emmett Till, American murder victim (b. 1941)

September

 September 20 – Robert Riskin, American screenwriter (b. 1897)
 September 23 – Martha Norelius, American Olympic swimmer (b. 1908)
 September 30
 Michael Chekhov, Russian actor, theatre director, and writer (b. 1891)
 James Dean, American actor (b. 1931)

October

 October 4 – Alexander Papagos, Greek Field Marshal (b. 1883)
 October 7 – Rodolphe Seeldrayers, German journalist and administrator, 4th President of FIFA (b. 1876)
 October 9
 Theodor Innitzer, Cardinal Archbishop of Vienna (b. 1875)
 Alice Joyce, American actress (b. 1890)
 October 13
 Manuel Ávila Camacho, 45th President of Mexico (b. 1897)
 Alexandrina Maria da Costa, Portuguese Roman Catholic mystic, victim soul and blessed (b. 1904)
 October 17 – Dimitrios Maximos, Prime Minister of Greece (b. 1873)
 October 18 – José Ortega y Gasset, Spanish philosopher (b. 1883)
 October 19 – John Hodiak, American actor (b. 1914)
 October 25 – Sadako Sasaki, Japanese atomic bomb sickness victim (b. 1943)
 October 27 – Juan de Dios Martínez, 23rd President of Ecuador (b. 1875)

November

 November 1 – Dale Carnegie, American writer and lecturer (b. 1888)
 November 4
 David Julius, American physiologist, Nobel Prize in Physiology or Medicine laureate (b.1903)
 Cy Young, American baseball player (Cleveland Spiders) and member of the MLB Hall of Fame (b. 1867)
 November 5 – Maurice Utrillo, French artist (b. 1883)
 November 6 – Edwin Barclay, 18th president of Liberia (b. 1882)
 November 7 – Tom Powers, American actor (b. 1890)
 November 12 – Alfréd Hajós, Hungarian swimmer and architect (b. 1878)
 November 14 – Robert E. Sherwood, American playwright (b. 1896)
 November 15 – Lloyd Bacon, American actor and director (b. 1889)
 November 17
 James P. Johnson, American pianist and composer (b. 1894)
 Helmuth Weidling, German general (b. 1891)
 November 22 – Shemp Howard, American actor and comedian (The Three Stooges) (b. 1895)
 November 27 – Arthur Honegger, French-born Swiss composer (b. 1892)

December

 December 5 – Jirō Minami, Japanese general and Governor-General of Korea (1936-1942) (b. 1874)
 December 6 – Honus Wagner, American baseball player (Pittsburgh Pirates) and a member of the MLB Hall of Fame (b. 1874)
 December 8 – Hermann Weyl, German mathematician, theoretical physicist and philosopher (b. 1885)
 December 13 – António Egas Moniz, Portuguese neurologist, recipient of the Nobel Prize in Physiology or Medicine (b. 1874)
 December 14 - Paddy Mayne, Irish & British lions rugby international, Founding member of the S.A.S
 December 15 – Otto Braun, German politician, former Minister President of the Free State of Prussia (b. 1872)
 December 18 – Anna Murray Vail, American botanist (b. 1863)
 December 21 – Garegin Nzhdeh, Armenian statesman (b. 1886)
 December 24 – Nana Bryant, American actress (b. 1888)

Nobel Prizes

 Physics – Willis Eugene Lamb and Polykarp Kusch
 Chemistry – Vincent du Vigneaud
 Physiology or Medicine – Axel Hugo Theodor Theorell
 Literature – Halldór Kiljan Laxness
 Peace – not awarded

References